Megas, or Magnús Þór Jónsson, (born 1945), is an Icelandic rock and roll singer, songwriter, and writer.

Megas may also refer to:

Megas (album), first album by singer Megas
Megas XLR, an American animated television series 
Megas logothetēs, an official or administrator of the Byzantine Empire
Megas doux, the commander-in-chief of the Byzantine navy
Megas droungarios tou stolou, the second-in-command 
Megas droungarios tēs viglas/viglēs, senior judicial position of the Byzantine Empire

See also
The Megas (disambiguation)
Mega (disambiguation)
Mega-, a unit prefix in metric systems of units denoting a factor of one million
The Magicks of Megas-tu, an episode of Star Trek: The Animated Series